Abyssotrophon crystallinus is a species of sea snail, a marine gastropod mollusk in the family Muricidae, the murex snails or rock snails.

Distribution
Found off the Pacific coast of Honshu, Japan, at a depth of 530 meters.

References

Abyssotrophon
Gastropods described in 1953